Angerville-Bailleul is a commune  in the Seine-Maritime department in the Normandy region in northern France.

Geography

Population

Places of interest
 The church of Saint-Medard, dating from the thirteenth century
 The sixteenth-century château de Bailleul and its surrounding parkland.
 The chapel of the chateau, dating from the sixteenth century

See also
Communes of the Seine-Maritime department

References

Communes of Seine-Maritime